David Hodge  is a Conservative Party politician who was Leader of Surrey County Council from 2011 to 2018.

He was previously a Tandridge District Councillor for the ward of Queens Park from 1997 to 2004.

He was appointed a CBE in the 2017 New Year Honours for services to local government and charity.

References

Year of birth missing (living people)
Living people
Conservative Party (UK) councillors
Members of Surrey County Council
Commanders of the Order of the British Empire
Leaders of local authorities of England